Choubey or Chaturvedi is a surname of Hindu Brahmins meaning knower of four Vedas. Notable people with the surname include:

Ashwini Kumar Choubey (born 1953), Indian politician
Balswarup Choubey (1934–2011), Indian nephrologist and medical academic
Narayan Choubey (1923–?), Indian politician
Santosh Choubey (born 1955), Indian social entrepreneur, educationalist, poet, and writer

See also
Chaubey